Michael Darragh MacAuley is a Gaelic footballer who plays club football for Ballyboden St Enda's and inter-county for Dublin county team from 2010 until 2020. He plays his club football with Ballyboden St Enda's, with whom he won the 2016 All-Ireland Senior Club Football Championship. He also won the 2009 Dublin Senior Football Championship, 2015 Dublin Senior Football Championship and 2015 Leinster Senior Football Club championship. MacAuley was the 2013 All Stars Footballer of the Year.

Playing career

Club
MacAuley plays his club football with Ballyboden St Enda's, with whom he won the Dublin Senior Football Championship in 2009.

Inter-county
MacAuley made his senior football debut for Dublin against Wexford in the first round of the O'Byrne Cup; he scored a point on his debut. McAuley made his debut in the league against the 2009 All-Ireland Champions Kerry. He scored a decisive point in the game which assured the win for Dublin against Kerry.

MacAuley made his Championship debut as a substitute against Wexford in the 2010 Leinster Senior Football Championship. He made his second appearance against Meath in the semi final of the Leinster football championship, a game in which Dublin were easily beaten by the Royals. MacAuley had his first start for Dublin against Tipperary in a second round qualifier for the All-Ireland Championship. He scored his first Championship goal and point in a game in which he finished with 1-01 of the final score of 1-21 to 1-13 at Croke Park. MacAuley scored a point in Dublin's eventual exit from that season's All-Ireland Championship at the semi-final stage.

MacAuley won his first All-Ireland Senior Football Championship in September 2011, when Dublin beat Kerry at Croke Park. He wasn't surprised by the comeback nature of the game, saying: "We had been down before in matches. It wasn't the first time we were down. We actually had a training game the week before when the As played the Bs and it was a very similar situation". His second All-Ireland title came against Mayo in 2013, as did the All Stars Footballer of the Year, when he succeeded Karl Lacey to the title.

On 21 January 2021, MacAuley announced his retirement form inter-county football.

Personal life 
After retiring from playing inter county football he moved to Hikkaduwa - a surfing town on the south coast of Sri Lanka.

Honours

Team

Dublin
All-Ireland Senior Football Championship (8): 2011, 2013, 2015, 2016, 2017, 2018, 2019, 2020
Leinster Senior Football Championship (10): 2011, 2012, 2013, 2014, 2015, 2016, 2017, 2018, 2019, 2020
 National Football League (5): 2013, 2014, 2015, 2016, 2018
 O'Byrne Cup (1): 2015

Ballyboden St Enda's
All-Ireland Senior Club Football Championship (1): 2016
Leinster Senior Club Football Championship (2): 2015, 2019
Dublin Senior Football Championship (3): 2009, 2015, 2019

Individual
 All Star Awards (2): 2011, 2013
 The Sunday Game Player of the Year (1): 2013
 All Stars Footballer of the Year (1): 2013

References

1986 births
Living people
Ballyboden St Enda's Gaelic footballers
Dublin inter-county Gaelic footballers
Winners of eight All-Ireland medals (Gaelic football)